The 1992 Baden-Württemberg state election was held on 5 April 1992 to elect the members of the 10th Landtag of Baden-Württemberg. The incumbent Christian Democratic Union (CDU) government under Minister-President Erwin Teufel lost its majority. The CDU suffered a 9.4% swing, mostly to the national conservative Republicans, who achieved their best result in a state election, placing third with 10.9%. After the election, the CDU formed a grand coalition with the Social Democratic Party (SPD), and Teufel was re-elected as Minister-President.

Parties
The table below lists parties represented in the previous Landtag of Baden-Württemberg.

Results

|-
! colspan="2" | Party
! Votes
! %
! +/-
! Seats 
! +/-
! Seats %
|-
| bgcolor=| 
| align=left | Christian Democratic Union (CDU)
| align=right| 1,960,016
| align=right| 39.6
| align=right| 9.4
| align=right| 64
| align=right| 2
| align=right| 43.8
|-
| bgcolor=| 
| align=left | Social Democratic Party (SPD)
| align=right| 1,454,477
| align=right| 29.4
| align=right| 2.6
| align=right| 46
| align=right| 4
| align=right| 31.5
|-
| bgcolor=| 
| align=left | The Republicans (REP)
| align=right| 539,014
| align=right| 10.9
| align=right| 9.9
| align=right| 15
| align=right| 15
| align=right| 10.3
|-
| bgcolor=| 
| align=left | The Greens (Grüne)
| align=right| 467,781
| align=right| 9.5
| align=right| 1.6
| align=right| 13
| align=right| 3
| align=right| 8.9
|-
| bgcolor=| 
| align=left | Free Democratic Party (FDP)
| align=right| 291,199
| align=right| 5.9
| align=right| 0.0
| align=right| 8
| align=right| 1
| align=right| 5.5
|-
! colspan=8|
|-
| bgcolor=| 
| align=left | Ecological Democratic Party (ÖDP)
| align=right| 93,604
| align=right| 1.9
| align=right| 0.5
| align=right| 0
| align=right| ±0
| align=right| 0
|-
| bgcolor=| 
| align=left | National Democratic Party (NPD)
| align=right| 44,416
| align=right| 0.9
| align=right| 1.2
| align=right| 0
| align=right| ±0
| align=right| 0
|-
| bgcolor=|
| align=left | Others
| align=right| 64,247
| align=right| 2.0
| align=right| 
| align=right| 0
| align=right| ±0
| align=right| 0
|-
! align=right colspan=2| Total
! align=right| 4,949,199
! align=right| 100.0
! align=right| 
! align=right| 146
! align=right| 21
! align=right| 
|-
! align=right colspan=2| Voter turnout
! align=right| 
! align=right| 70.1
! align=right| 1.7
! align=right| 
! align=right| 
! align=right| 
|}

Sources
 Ergebnisse der Landtagswahlen in Baden-Württemberg 1992

1992 elections in Germany
1992
April 1992 events in Europe